Mykola Lebed ( or ; January 11, 1909 – July 18, 1998), also known as Maksym Ruban, Marko or Yevhen Skyrba, was a Ukrainian political activist, Ukrainian nationalist, guerrilla fighter, and war criminal. He was among those tried, convicted, and imprisoned for the murder of Polish Interior Minister Bronisław Pieracki, in 1934. The court sentenced him to death, but the state commuted the sentence to life imprisonment. He escaped when the Germans invaded Poland in 1939. As leader of OUN-B he was responsible for the ethnic cleansing of Poles in Volhynia and Eastern Galicia.

In 2009, the United States Congress directed the National Archives and Records Administration to review declassified intelligence records pertaining to the activities of the Nazis and the Japanese Imperial Government that were not processed in time for the Nazi War Crimes and Japanese Imperial Government Records Interagency Working Group's (IWG) final report in 2007. The follow-up report from the IWG's Richard Breitman and Norman J. W. Goda included a discussion of Lebed's relationship with the Central Intelligence Agency during the Cold War. In 1949 he emigrated to the United States and lived in New York. Through Prolog Research Corporation, his CIA funded organization, he gathered intelligence on the Soviet Union as late as into the late 1960s. The CIA project name for the operation was AERODYNAMIC. The report stated that as late as 1991 the CIA, for fear of compromising the operation and triggering outrage within the Ukrainian émigré community, shielded Lebed from prosecution for war crimes by preventing the United States Department of Justice's Office of Special Investigations from learning about his wartime connections to the Nazis. He died in 1998.

Early life
Born in Novi Strilyshcha, a small town in Galicia, nowadays western part of Ukraine (at the time, Austria-Hungary), Lebed completed his studies in Lviv which during the Interbellum was part of the Second Polish Republic. In 1930-32 he took an active part in setting up youth groups of Organization of Ukrainian Nationalists (OUN) in the area around Lviv. From 1932 to 1934 he directed communications between the Ukrainian Executive and the Foreign Command of the OUN.

In 1934, he participated in the preparation of the assassination of the Polish Minister of Internal Affairs Bronisław Pieracki. After the assassination he attempted to flee through Gdańsk-Szczecin to Germany, but by order of Himmler was arrested by the Gestapo and handed over to the Polish authorities. During the Warsaw Process (1934–36) he was given the death penalty which was later commuted to life imprisonment. He escaped in September 1939 while being evacuated from the Bereza Kartuska Prison due to the threatening Soviet invasion.

From November 1939 through March 1940 he served as the chief of the school of espionage and sabotage founded by the Abwehr in Zakopane.

World War II

In 1940, during the internal conflict that erupted within the Organization of Ukrainian Nationalists (OUN) he supported Stepan Bandera, and, in 1941, became his assistant. In June 1941, he was one of the functionaries in the short-lived Ukrainian government. In 1942, he was a participant in the 3rd Special Conference of the OUN, and headed the head council and the delegate for external contacts of the Direction of the OUN.

Lebed assumed control of Bandera's faction of the OUN in western Ukraine, which would come to dominate the Ukrainian Insurgent Army (UPA) until 1943. As leader of OUN-B, Lebed was responsible for the ethnic cleansing of around 100,000 Poles in Volhynia and Eastern Galicia, including giving orders to carry out the killings.

In 1944 he became one of the founders of the Ukrainian Supreme Liberation Council (UHVR) and the general Secretary of International Policies of the UHVR. At the recommendation of the UHVR he traveled to the West where he contacted various Western governments. In 1948, he became a member of the OUN (Diaspora).

Alleged collaboration with Nazi Germany 
In a government reports publication, published by the National Archives, Lebed is being suspected of having collaborated with Nazi Germany.

Lebed was described as a "Ukrainian fascist leader and suspected Nazi collaborator", and later labeled as a "well-known sadist and collaborator of the Germans" by United States Army counterintelligence.

On the other hand, it was also stated, that Lebed himself was persecuted by the Gestapo: "it (OUN/B) fought German rule, and the Gestapo put a price on Lebed's head."

Post-war activities
From 1949, Lebed lived in the United States. During 1952–1974, he headed the research center "Prologue" in New York; in 1982–85, he was Deputy Chairman and since 1974 he was a Member of the Board of Directors of the institution. In 1956-91 he was a member of the board of the Ukrainian Society of Foreign Studies in Munich and Toronto, publishing committee "Chronicle of the UPA (1975). Author memories "UPA" (1946, 1987). Thanks to his collaboration with the CIA and their active shielding of him, Lebed was never tried for the war crimes he and his men had committed against Poles and Jews during WWII.

References

Further reading
 Declassified CIA-files about Project AERODYNAMIC (3792 files as of May 2014)
 (In Russian) Chuyev, Sergei - Ukrainskyj Legion - Moscow, 2006
 Ihor yeremeyev: The organizer of Ukrainian Special services

1909 births
1998 deaths
People from Lviv Oblast
People from the Kingdom of Galicia and Lodomeria
Ukrainian Austro-Hungarians
Organization of Ukrainian Nationalists
Ukrainian collaborators with Nazi Germany
Contractees of the Central Intelligence Agency
Ukrainian anti-communists
Ukrainian Insurgent Army
Ukrainian independence activists
Ukrainian prisoners sentenced to death
Holocaust perpetrators in Poland
Massacres of Poles in Eastern Galicia
Prisoners sentenced to death by Poland